The Anglican Diocese of Igbomina-West is one of eight within the Anglican Province of Kwara, itself one of 14 provinces within the Church of Nigeria. The current bishop is Olajide Adebayo.

The diocese was established in 2009.

Bishops

Notes

Dioceses of the Province of Kwara
Church of Nigeria dioceses
2009 establishments in Nigeria